Alexander (Alec) Yule Fraser (1857–1890) was a Scottish mathematician, one of the founders of the Edinburgh Mathematical Society.

Life and work 
Fraser studied at the University of Aberdeen where he graduated in 1881. After that, he was appointed Mathematical Master at George Watson's College (Edinburgh). In 1889 he was appointed Headmaster at Allan Glen's School (Glasgow) but he remained only two months because a severe pleurisy forced him to leave Scotland going to South Africa in search of a better climate. Back to Scotland, his health deteriorated rapidly and died in Glasgow thirty three years old.

Alec married the singer Marjory Kennedy-Fraser in 1887 and they had a couple, David (1888–1962) and Helen Patuffa (1889–1967). David Kennedy Fraser became a psychologist, educator and amateur mathematician. Patuffa was a singer and musician, as her mother.

Fraser is mainly remembered for being one of the founding fathers of the Edinburgh Mathematical Society.

References

Bibliography

External links 
 

19th-century Scottish mathematicians
1857 births
1890 deaths